is the third game in the PS2 trilogy of Space Battleship Yamato games.

References

External links
IGN Review

2005 video games
Japan-exclusive video games
PlayStation 2 games
PlayStation 2-only games
Bandai games
Space Battleship Yamato video games
Video games developed in Japan